The No Sound Without Silence Tour is the third arena tour by Irish pop rock band The Script. Launched in support of their fourth studio album No Sound Without Silence (2014), the tour began in Tokyo on 16 January 2015 and visited Europe, North America, Asia, Africa and Oceania. The opening acts were American singer Phillip Phillips for the South African dates, and English singer Tinie Tempah for the European dates. Pharrell Williams served as a co-headliner for the Croke Park concert on 20 June 2015.

Opening acts
Colton Avery (Europe, North America, Australia, Philippines, Thailand, Malaysia)
Mary Lambert (North America)
Phillip Phillips (South Africa)
Silent Sanctuary  (Philippines)
Tinie Tempah (Europe)
Pharrell Williams (Dublin)
The Wailers (Dublin)
The Sam Willows (Singapore)
Kensington (Europe)

Setlist
This setlist is based on previous performances of the tour.

 "Paint the Town Green"
 "Hail Rain or Sunshine"
 "Breakeven"
 "Before the Worst"
 "Superheroes"
 "We Cry"
 "If You Could See Me Now"
 "Man on a Wire"
 "Nothing"
 "Good Ol' Days"
 "Never Seen Anything (Quite Like You)"
 "The Man Who Can't Be Moved"
 "You Won't Feel A Thing"
 "It's Not Right For You"
 "Six Degrees of Separation"
 "The Energy Never Dies"
 "For the First Time"
 "No Good in Goodbye"
 "Hall of Fame"

Additional information
 During the performance in Sheffield, The Script did not perform "We Cry" due to a fan collapsing - Danny called for paramedic to check on her - she made a speedy recovery and the band were able to carry on with the rest of the show.
 During the performance in Barcelona, The Script did not perform "The End Where I Begin", "Nothing", "Six Degrees Of Separation", and "It's Not Right For You".
 During the performance in Oakland, The Script did not perform "The End Where I Begin", "We Cry", and "Six Degrees of Separation".
 During the performance in Toronto, The Script did not perform "The End Where I Begin" and "Six Degrees of Separation".
 During the performance in Hamburg, The Script did not perform "Nothing" and "Never Seen Anything (Quite Like You)".

Tour dates

Notes

References

2015 concert tours
The Script concert tours